Savarakathi is a 2018 Tamil black comedy drama film directed by G. R. Adithya, written and produced by his brother Mysskin. The film stars Ram, Poorna and Mysskin with Ashvatt and Swathishta. Featuring music composed by Arrol Corelli, the film began production during November 2015, and was released across India on 9 February 2018.

Cast
 Ram as Pitchai Moorthy
 Poorna as Subadhra
 Mysskin as Mangeswaran
 Ashvatt as Gautaman
 Swathishta as Kayal
 Shaji Chen as Madman (cameo appearance)

Production
Mysskin launched the production of the film during July 2015, and announced that he would also write the script for the film and play the antagonist. He stated that he was inspired to write the script based on a real life barber he knew, who would only tell lies. The film's director was Mysskin's brother, G. R. Adithya, who had previously apprenticed under filmmakers such as R. Parthiepan and Mysskin himself. Adithya had initially been contracted to make a film for a different production studio but after the project got shelved, he convinced Mysskin to give him an opportunity to direct the project. Another director, Ram, was signed on to play the lead role of the barber, with Adithya keen on selecting someone with an "innocent" face. Ram initially refused the offer, as he felt that the film would undo his public image of being a serious film-maker, but later accepted to feature in the project. Poorna was selected after six heroines, including Priyamani, had refused the opportunity to be a part of the film. The actress revealed that she would play a hearing-impaired pregnant lady in the film, and prior to the start of shoot, she took part in a ten-day workshop where she learnt to speak the Sivagangai slang and was taught how to portray the character by Adithya. Adithya chose to take inspiration for the role from the personality and body language of his and Mysskin's own mother. Ashvatt, who previously appeared in Mysskin's Pisaasu and Thupparivaalan, was signed on to play a key role in the film, while television anchor Swathishta Krishnan also joined the cast.
The soundtrack and teaser of the film was released on 15 October 2016, and then re-released in January 2018, with a bonus song and instrumental tracks added. Despite being completed in late 2016, the film was delayed and eventually the makers of the film chose to promote Mysskin's name over Adithya's name in the promotional posters to make use of his brand name post the success of Thupparivaalan.

Soundtrack

The film's music was composed by Arrol Corelli, while the audio rights of the film was acquired by U1 Records. The album released on 22 January 2018 and featured two songs and six extra instrumental tracks.

References

External links 

2018 films
2010s Tamil-language films
Indian thriller films
2018 thriller films